The Pioneer Building is a historic building in San Francisco, California. It was listed on the National Register of Historic Places in 1987, as "Pioneer Trunk Factory--C. A. Malm & Co."

The building is located at 2185-2199 Folsom and 3180 18th Streets.

It previously housed the office of Stripe. 

As of 2020, it houses the offices of OpenAI and Neuralink.

References

Commercial buildings on the National Register of Historic Places in California
National Register of Historic Places in San Francisco